Tuyaa is a Mongolian female given name. Notable people with the name include:

Yadamsürengiin Tuyaa (born 1947), Mongolian Olympic gymnast
Nyam-Osoryn Tuyaa (born 1958), Mongolian politician

Mongolian given names
Feminine given names